Estádio Governador Plácido Castelo, also known as the Castelão (Portuguese for "Big Castle") or Gigante da Boa Vista, is a football stadium that was inaugurated on November 11, 1973 in Fortaleza, Ceará, Brazil, with a maximum capacity of 63,903 spectators. The stadium is owned by the Ceará state Government, and is the home ground of Ceará Sporting Club and Fortaleza Esporte Clube. Its formal name honors Plácido Aderaldo Castelo (1906–1979), who served as the Governor of Ceará from September 12, 1966 to March 15, 1971, and was a leader in getting the stadium built.

History
Castelão was constructed from 1969 to 1973 and was inaugurated on November 11 of that year.

In May 2000, the Ceará state government started to renovate the stadium. The renovations were divided in three stages, and started on May 16, 2001. The first stage consisted in the recovery of the ditches, and of the bleachers junctions, as well as the recovery of the low walls. The second stage of the reformation started on July 20, 2001, and consisted in the recovery and strengthening of the stadium's physical structure. The third stage consisted in the recovery of the electrical, hydraulic, sanitary, and electronic installations.

The inaugural match was played on November 11, 1973, when Ceará and Fortaleza drew 0-0. The stadium's first goal was scored on November 18, 1973 by Ceará's Erandy, when Ceará beat Vitória 1-0.

The re-inaugural match was played on March 23, 2002, when the Brazil national team beat the Yugoslavia national team 1-0. The stadium's first goal after the re-inauguration was scored by Brazil's Luizão.
The stadium's attendance record currently stands at 118,496, set on August 27, 1980, when the Brazil national team beat the Uruguay national team 1-0.

The stadium was reopened on December 16, 2012, in a ceremony attended by former president Dilma Rousseff and Mayor of Ceara, Cid Gomes. There was also a concert from Raimundo Fagner.

2013 FIFA Confederations Cup
Estadio Castelão hosted 3 games of the 2013 FIFA Confederations Cup: two group games and one of the semi-finals.

2014 FIFA World Cup
Castelão was one of the venues of the 2014 FIFA World Cup, which took place in Brazil. The stadium was redeveloped for the tournament; the reconstruction project, led by Uruguayan architect Héctor Vigliecca, involved the addition of a larger roof, the construction of an underground car park with 4,200 spaces, and a new lower tier. After the redevelopment, the stadium now has an all-seater capacity of 63,903. The stadium closed on March 31, 2011 for the reconstruction project, which was officially completed in December 2012. Castelão was the first of 12 stadiums being built or redeveloped for the 2014 World Cup to be completed.

Other events
On July 9, 1980, the 10th National Eucharistic Congress was opened in Fortaleza. Pope John Paul II participated in the celebrations of the Congress and the Estádio Castelão received the largest public of its history: 120,000 people. On this occasion, during Virgílio Távora's government, the stadium was renovated, and the bleachers of the lower section were finished.

Another religious celebration happened on August 13, 1995. On this occasion, the farewell mass of the archbishop of Fortaleza Dom Aloísio Lorscheider  gathered 50 thousand people.

Several artistic shows were made at the stadium.

On December 9, 2007, Castelão hosted the MotoCross Freestyle World Championship . More than 700 tons of sand and metal ramps, almost 6 meters long and 2.7 meters high were used in the event.

Concerts

Gallery

References

External links

 
 FIFA Profile

Ceará Sporting Club
Fortaleza Esporte Clube
Football venues in Ceará
Sports venues in Ceará
Sports venues completed in 1973
2014 FIFA World Cup stadiums
2013 FIFA Confederations Cup stadiums